Tubby the Tuba is a 1975 animated musical-comedy film, based on the 1945 children's story for concert orchestra and narrator by Paul Tripp and George Kleinsinger. It was released on April 1, 1975 by Avco Embassy Pictures. The film was produced by the New York Institute of Technology, under the supervision of its founder, Alexander Schure, who was the project's director.

Nearly three decades before the release of this adaptation, stop-motion innovator George Pal made a 1947 Puppetoon version also based on Tripp and Kleisinger's work, which was nominated for a Best Animated Short Oscar, but lost to Warner Bros. Cartoons' Merrie Melodies short, Tweetie Pie.

Plot
A young tuba named Tubby sets off on a quest to find a song of his own. He visits a circus and ventures into the forest while on the way to Singing City.

Voice cast
 Paul Tripp as Narrator
 Dick Van Dyke as Tubby the Tuba
 David Wayne as Pee-Wee the Piccolo
 Pearl Bailey as Mrs. Elephant
 Jack Gilford as The Herald
 Ray Middleton as The Great Pepperino
 Jane Powell as Celeste
 Cyril Ritchard as The Frog
 Ruth Enders as The Haughty Violin
 Hermione Gingold as Ms. Squeek

Production
Tubby the Tuba had his start as the main character in a 1945 children's story for orchestra and narrator, by Paul Tripp and George Kleinsinger, originally performed by Tripp himself, and recorded most famously by Danny Kaye, though many other actor-narrators have performed the piece on record as well, including David Wayne (who also provided a voice for the '71 feature film). The success of the Decca Records track encouraged George Pal, the Puppetoon artist, to make a 1947 short based on it. It would later receive an Oscar nomination for Best Animated Short.

A full-length version of Tubby the Tuba was announced in 1974 by Alexander Schure, the millionaire founder of the New York Institute of Technology. He set up the production at its Westbury, New York facilities, in the Animation Department, Visual Arts Center and Tech Sound Lab of that campus. In order for it to compete with the works of children's film leader Disney, he rounded up a celebrity cast (led by Dick Van Dyke and Pearl Bailey), as well as Tripp, the librettist, and a man known as "the dean of Broadway musical directors", Lehman Engel.

Schure, however, did not know anything about the animation process at the time he started working on it. Because of this, he hired the industry's best artists from the Eastern Seaboard, among whom were Sam Singer from Courageous Cat and Minute Mouse, and John Gentilella from the classic Popeye series.

Schure found the progress on the new Tubby was very slow, hindered by the tedious frame-by-frame process occasionally encountered in the hand-drawn art. In response, he turned to an interest in the then-young field of computer graphics, and recruited several consultants and scientists from NYIT so that the project could go on. Two of the later crew members were Edwin Catmull and Alvy Ray Smith, the future founders of Pixar Studios.

Thus, it should have marked the first time that computers were ever used in the making of an animated feature, but it ended up being done the conventional way after all. When the film wrapped up production, the first test screenings did not do as well as the crew had hoped it would. As a result, Catmull removed Sam Singer's name from the final prints, taking a credit in Singer's place. He later went on to say about the initial reaction to Tubby:

Of director Schure, Catmull's partner Smith observed: "We realized […] that he really didn't have what it takes to make a movie". Neither of the duo were satisfied with what the finished film had to offer.

Release
In 1974, some time after the end of its production, independent distributor Avco Embassy acquired the rights to release Tubby worldwide. The film came out in select U.S. markets during the following Easter holiday.

The feature-length Tubby has been generally forgotten in the annals of animation history since its original run, but on September 11, 2006, a small label called Pegasus brought out a Region 2 DVD in the United Kingdom. To date, it has only received minor VHS releases in North America, including:

 Children's Video Library (1983)
 Vestron Video (1985)
 Family Home Entertainment (early 1990s)
 Sony Wonder (1995)

See also
 Timeline of CGI in film and television
 List of animated feature-length films

References

 Allmovie incorrectly lists the release year as 1977.

Sources
 Beck, Jerry (2005). The Animated Movie Guide. . Chicago Reader Press. Accessed April 9, 2007.

External links
 
 
 

1975 films
1975 animated films
American children's animated comedy films
American children's animated fantasy films
American children's animated musical films
1970s American animated films
1970s children's comedy films
1970s children's animated films
1970s children's fantasy films
Embassy Pictures films
Films directed by Alexander Schure
1975 comedy films
1970s English-language films